Shahar Vikas Aghadi (City Development Front) is a name that has been used by several local political parties and groupings in the Indian state of Maharashtra.

Groups include Shahar Vikas Aghadi in Mira-Bhayendar (existed in 2003), Shahar Vikas Aghadi in Jalgaon (existed in 2002, formed by Nationalist Congress Party leader Sureshdada Jain), Pune Shahar Vikas Aghadi in Pune and ]]Wai Shahar Vikas Aghadi]] in Wai (existed in 1998).

Political parties in Maharashtra